The 2019 Sugar Bowl was a college football bowl game played on January 1, 2019. It was the 85th edition of the Sugar Bowl, and one of the 2018–19 bowl games concluding the 2018 FBS football season. Sponsored by the Allstate insurance company, the game was officially known as the Allstate Sugar Bowl.

Teams
The Sugar Bowl matches the champions of the Big 12 Conference and Southeastern Conference (SEC), unless a champion team is selected for the College Football Playoff, in which case another team from the same conference is invited. Per that criterion, a matchup of Texas and Georgia was announced on December 2. The two programs had previously met four times, with Texas having won three times (including the 1949 Orange Bowl) and Georgia winning once (the 1984 Cotton Bowl Classic).

Texas Longhorns

Texas lost the 2018 Big 12 Championship Game to Oklahoma, then became the Big 12 representative in the Sugar Bowl when Oklahoma was selected for the College Football Playoff. Texas entered the bowl with a 9–4 record (7–2 in conference).

Georgia Bulldogs

Georgia lost the 2018 SEC Championship Game to Alabama, then became the SEC representative in the Sugar Bowl when Alabama was selected for the College Football Playoff. Georgia entered the bowl with an 11–2 record (7–1 in conference).

Game summary
Texas defeated a heavily favored Georgia team, 28–21. Quarterback Sam Ehlinger was named the game MVP.

Scoring summary

Statistics

References

External links
 Box score at ESPN

Sugar Bowl
Sugar Bowl
Georgia Bulldogs football bowl games
Texas Longhorns football bowl games
Sugar Bowl
Sugar Bowl